This is a comprehensive listing of official video releases by Depeche Mode, a British electronic music group. Depeche Mode have released fifty-seven music videos (not including remixed and edited versions), twelve music VHS/DVDs, and six DVD singles on Mute Records, Sire Records and Reprise Records.

Most of the group's early music videos were directed by Clive Richardson and Peter Care. Following the time with Richardson and Care, Depeche Mode developed a working relationship with award-winning director and photographer Anton Corbijn, who has directed the majority of their videos since. The group's concert video Devotional was nominated for "Best Long Form Music Video" at the 37th Grammy Awards in 1995.

Music videos

Video albums

DVD singles

Tour projections

See also
Depeche Mode discography

References

Other sources

 "Discography: Home Video". DepecheMode.com. Retrieved 31 October 2007.
 "Video: Music Videos". DepecheMode.com. Retrieved 1 November 2007.

External links

Depeche Mode video albums
Videographies of British artists